Anna Laura Orrico (born 29 December 1980 in Cosenza) is an Italian politician and entrepreneur.

Biography 
She is a Deputy of the Legislature XVIII of Italy with the Five Star Movement for the college of Cosenza, from 16 September 2019 to 13 February 2021 she has been Undersecretary of the Ministry for Cultural Heritage and Activities of the Conte II Government.

References 

1980 births
Living people
People from Cosenza
Deputies of Legislature XVII of Italy
21st-century Italian women politicians
20th-century Italian women
Women members of the Chamber of Deputies (Italy)